The Green Fury is the third album from Matt Pond PA, released in 2002.

Track listing
 "Canadian Song" – 3:06
 "Measure 3" – 3:33
 "Neighbor's New Yard" – 1:03
 "City Plan" – 4:06
 "Promise the Bite" – 2:57
 "Silence" – 2:40
 "This Is Montreal" – 1:20
 "A Part of the Woods" – 3:22
 "A New Part of Town" – 4:03
 "Jefferson" – 2:36
 "Crickets" – 3:46
 "It Becomes Night" – 2:35
 "Copper Mine" – 3:49

2002 albums
Matt Pond PA albums
Polyvinyl Record Co. albums